CHEP may refer to:
CHEP:  Commonwealth Handling Equipment Pool 
CHEP Conference:  International Conference on Computing in High Energy and Nuclear Physics